Gabungan Sepakbola Massenrempulu Enrekang or Gasma Enrekang is an Indonesian football team based in Enrekang Regency, South Sulawesi. They currently competes in Liga 3.

Current squad

Honours
 Liga 3 South Sulawesi
 Champion: 2021
 Habibie Cup
 Winner: 2010

References

External links
 

Football clubs in Indonesia
Football clubs in South Sulawesi